The Diocese of Hispania was a late antique administrative unit (Dioecesis) of the Roman Empire on the Iberian Peninsula. It existed from 314 to about 409 AD. Its capital was Augusta Emerita. The Diocese was governed by a vicarius responsible to the praetorian prefect of Gaul.

Organization
The Diocese of Hispania originally comprised the following six provinces:
Hispania Baetica
Lusitania
Carthaginiensis
Gallaecia
Hispania Tarraconensis
Mauretania Tingitana (in North Africa)

The Balearic Islands were detached from Tarraconensis in the 4th century as the independent province of Hispania Balearica, becoming the seventh province within the Diocese of Hispania.

History
The Roman Empire was initially divided into 46 provinces, which were subdivided by Diocletian around 300 AD into 101 provinces, which in turn were grouped into 12 dioceses. At the division of the Empire in 395, the structure was changed into four prefectures, 15 dioceses and 119 provinces. With the conquest of Hispania by the Vandals, Alans, and Suebi in 409, the diocese began to collapse.

Further reading

Hispania
Ancient history of the Iberian Peninsula
Spain in the Roman era
Portugal in the Roman era